Mysterians may refer to:
The Mysterians – 1957 Japanese science fiction movie, and the eponymous aliens
? & the Mysterians – rock group best known for the 1966 hit "96 Tears"
Adherents of New Mysterianism, a philosophy proposing that certain problems, like the nature of consciousness, may never be explained

See also
Mysteria (disambiguation)
Mysterion (disambiguation)
Mysterons (disambiguation)